Jardim is a municipality located in the Brazilian state of Mato Grosso do Sul. Its population was 26,238 (2020) and its area is 2,202 km².

The municipality holds the Buraco das Araras Private Natural Heritage Reserve, whose main feature is the huge sinkhole named the Buraco das Araras.

References

Municipalities in Mato Grosso do Sul